The 2010 Tour de Pologne was the 67th running of the Tour de Pologne, in the 82nd year since the first edition. The event was part of both the 2010 UCI ProTour and the World Calendar. It ran from 1 to 7 August and commenced in Sochaczew and finished in Kraków.

Teams
Twenty three teams have been invited to the 2010 Tour de Pologne.

Teams from the UCI Pro Tour

Teams awarded a wildcard invitation

Stages
Aside from entering the Czech Republic (to the city of Český Těšín on the border with Poland) during the fourth stage, the race stages started and ended in Polish locations.

Stage 1
1 August 2010 – Sochaczew to Warsaw,

Stage 2
2 August 2010 – Rawa Mazowiecka to Dąbrowa Górnicza,

Stage 3
3 August 2010 – Sosnowiec to Katowice,

Stage 4
4 August 2010 – Tychy to Cieszyn,

Stage 5
5 August 2010 – Jastrzębie-Zdrój to Ustroń,

Stage 6
6 August 2010 – Oświęcim to Bukowina Tatrzańska,

Stage 7
7 August 2010 – Nowy Targ to Kraków,

Category leadership table

References

External links

 

Tour De Pologne
Tour de Pologne
Tour De Pologne, 2010
Tour de Pologne
August 2010 sports events in Europe